Artists' Rifles is the fourth album by Piano Magic, released in 2000 on the Rocket Girl label.

Track listing 

 "(1.16)" 1:16
 "No Closure" 5:11
 "A Return to the Sea" 5:03
 "(1.22)" 1:22
 "You and John are Birds" 5:55
 "The Index" 3:29
 "(1.50)" 1:50
 "Century Schoolbook" 3:47
 "Password" 7:08
 "Artists' Rifles" 4:22

References

2000 albums
Piano Magic albums